Conus angioiorum is a species of sea snail, a marine gastropod mollusk in the family Conidae, the cone snails and their allies.

Like all species within the genus Conus, these snails are predatory and venomous. They are capable of "stinging" humans, therefore live ones should be handled carefully or not at all.

Description
The size of the shell varies between 26 mm and 45 mm.

Distribution
This species occurs in the Indian Ocean off Somalia and Madagascar.

References

External links
 The Conus Biodiversity website
 Cone Shells – Knights of the Sea
 

angioiorum
Gastropods described in 1992